The Kpledjoo Festival is an annual harvest festival celebrated by the chiefs and peoples of Tema in the Greater Accra Region of Ghana. It is usually celebrated in late March or first week in April.

Celebration 
It is celebrated to facilitate the recovery of the Sakumo Lagoon for high yield during harvest. There is a 5-month temporary ban on trapping of crabs and fishing from the lagoon before the festival.

Before the public are allowed access to the lagoon, the priest of the Sakumo lagoon performs some rituals on the banks.

During the grand-durbar, there is merry-making and hugs from the chiefs and the inhabitants.

References 

Festivals in Ghana
Tema
Greater Accra Region